Tal Hutchins (born November 25, 1949) is a Democratic member of the West Virginia House of Delegates, representing the 3rd District since 2006. He earlier served from 1994 through 2000.

External links
West Virginia Legislature - Delegate Tal Hutchins official government website
Project Vote Smart - Representative Tal Hutchins (WV) profile
Follow the Money - Tal Hutchins
2008 2006 2004 2002 2000 1998 campaign contributions

African-American state legislators in West Virginia
Democratic Party members of the West Virginia House of Delegates
1949 births
Living people
Educators from West Virginia
Politicians from Wheeling, West Virginia
Bowling Green State University alumni
West Virginia University alumni
21st-century African-American people
20th-century African-American people